Germán Hernández Amores (10 June 1823, Murcia16 May 1894, Murcia) was a Spanish painter who specialized in Classical, mythological, and Biblical scenes. He was one of the few artists in Spain to adopt stylistic elements from the German Nazarene movement.

Biography
He began by studying drawing with the Italian-born sculptor, Santiago Baglietto (1781-1853), at the Sociedad Económica de los Amigos del País in Murcia. Then, he studied at the Real Academia de Bellas Artes de San Fernando, with José and Federico de Madrazo. During this time, he paid his way by doing book illustrations. 

There, he studied with Charles Gleyre. He was there until 1857 and made contact with several German painters of the Nazarene movement, which influenced his style. 

In 1858, he was awarded a Second Class prize at the National Exhibition of Fine Arts for his painting of Socrates reprimanding Alcibiades. His depiction of the Virgin Mary and Saint John on their way to Ephesus received a First Class prize at the Exhibition of 1862. He would continue to participate until 1892, but won no further prizes.   

Later, he became a Professor at the Escuela Superior de Pintura and, in 1892, was named a member of the Real Academia. 

His younger brother, was also a well-known painter.

Sources
Biography @ the Museo del Prado
Biography @ MCN Biografías
 Diccionario de Arte, Pintores del siglo XIX, Editorial LIBSA, 2001. .

External links

1823 births
1894 deaths
Spanish painters
Biblical art
Mythological painters
Real Academia de Bellas Artes de San Fernando alumni
People from Murcia